Alan Burrage Stout Jr (November 26, 1932 – February 1, 2018) was an American composer of contemporary classical music.

Born in Baltimore, Maryland, Stout studied at Johns Hopkins University (B.S., 1954) and at the Peabody Conservatory. His instructors included Henry Cowell, Wallingford Riegger, John Verrall, and Vagn Holmboe, the latter at the University of Copenhagen in Denmark for a year. He then studied at the University of Washington, obtaining a M.A. in 1959.

Stout taught at Northwestern University beginning in 1962. His notable students include Joseph Schwantner, Augusta Read Thomas, Jay Kawarsky, Jared Spears, Marilyn Shrude, Maggi Payne, Michael Twomey, Justinian Tamusuza, Frank Ferko and Michael Pisaro. 

Stout's style was modernist, incorporating elements of 12-tone music as well as experimental styles. His music has been performed by the Chicago Symphony Orchestra, Philadelphia Orchestra, and Baltimore Symphony Orchestra.

Stout lived in Evanston, Illinois.

References

External links
Alan Stout page
Interview with Alan Stout, June 12, 1997
Frank Villella, "Remembering Alan Stout", From the Archives blog, February 2, 2018
John von Rhein, "Alan Stout dies: NU composer and professor was a major figure in Chicago music", Chicago Tribune, February 3, 2018

1932 births
2018 deaths
American male classical composers
American classical composers
20th-century classical composers
American classical pianists
Male classical pianists
American male pianists
Northwestern University faculty
Musicians from Chicago
University of Washington alumni
Johns Hopkins University alumni
Musicians from Baltimore
Musicians from Evanston, Illinois
Pupils of Henry Cowell
Pupils of Vagn Holmboe
Pupils of Wallingford Riegger
Writers from Evanston, Illinois
20th-century American composers
Classical musicians from Illinois
20th-century American male musicians